The French Confession of Faith (1559) or Confession de La Rochelle or Gallic Confession of Faith (Confessio Gallicana) is a Reformed confession of faith. 

Under the sponsorship of Geneva a Calvinist church was organised in Paris  in 1555 with a formal organisation and regular services. Later other Calvinist churches were organized elsewhere in France. The Gallic Confession began as a statement of faith sent by these "Reformed" churches of France to John Calvin in 1557 during a period of persecution. Working from this, and probably with the help of Theodore Beza and Pierre Viret, Calvin and his pupil De Chandieu wrote a confession for them in the form of thirty-five articles. When persecution subsided, twenty delegates representing seventy-two churches met secretly in Paris from 23 to 27 May 1559. With François de Morel as moderator, the delegates produced a Constitution of Ecclesiastical Discipline and a Confession of Faith: Calvin's thirty-five articles were all used in the confession, apart from the first two which were expanded into six. Thus the Gallic Confession had forty articles. 

In 1560 the confession was presented to Francis II with a preface requesting that persecution should cease. The confession was confirmed at the seventh national synod of the French churches at La Rochelle in 1571, and recognized by German synods at Wesel in 1568 and Emden in 1571.

Notes 

The original draft of Calvin's articles is in the Genevan Archives.
P. Schaff, Creeds of Christendom (4th ed., 1905), vol. I.
A. Cochrane Reformed Confessions of the Sixteenth Century (1966).

External links 
Text of the French Confession of Faith in the original French with English translation, from Philip Schaff's Creeds of the Evangelical Protestant Churches at the CCEL
The text of the Gallic Confession in the original and in English

Calvinist texts
Huguenot history in France
Protestant Reformation
Reformed confessions of faith
1559 works
16th-century Calvinism